Fencing at the 2013 Canada Summer Games was in Sherbrooke, Quebec at the Centre de l'activité physique of the Cégep de Sherbrooke.  It was held from the 12 to 18 August. This was fencing's first time at the Summer Games as it was moved over from the Winter edition to replace rugby sevens. There were 6 events of fencing.

Medal table
The following is the medal table for fencing at the 2013 Canada Summer Games.

Fencing

Men's

Women's

References

External links 

2013 Canada Summer Games
2013 in fencing
2013 Canada Summer Games
Fencing competitions in Canada